Peadar Timmins (born 8 January 1994) is an Irish rugby union player for Pro14 and European Rugby Champions Cup side Leinster.

References

External links
Leinster Academy Profile
Ireland U20 Profile

1994 births
Living people
Irish rugby union players
Leinster Rugby players
Rugby union flankers
Rugby union players from County Wicklow